The Occitano-Romance or Gallo-Narbonnese, or rarely East Iberian, is a branch of the Romance language group that encompasses the Catalan/Valencian and Occitan languages spoken in parts of southern France and northeastern Spain.

Extent
The group covers the languages of the southern part of France (Occitania including Northern Catalonia), eastern Spain (Catalonia, Valencian Community, Balearic Islands, La Franja, Carche, Northern Aragon), together with Andorra, Monaco, parts of Italy (Occitan Valleys, Alghero, Guardia Piemontese), and historically in the County of Tripoli and the possessions of the Crown of Aragon. The existence of this group of languages is discussed on both linguistic and political bases.

Classification of Catalan
According to some linguists both Occitan and Catalan/Valencian should be considered Gallo-Romance languages. Other linguists concur as regarding Occitan but consider Catalan and Aragonese to be part of the Ibero-Romance languages.

The issue at debate is as political as it is linguistic because the division into Gallo-Romance and Ibero-Romance languages stems from the current nation states of France and Spain and so is based more on territorial criteria than historic and linguistic criteria. One of the main proponents of the unity of the languages of the Iberian Peninsula was Spanish philologist Ramón Menéndez Pidal, and for a long time, others such as Swiss linguist Wilhelm Meyer-Lübke (Das Katalanische, Heidelberg, 1925) have supported the kinship of Occitan and Catalan. Also, due to Aragonese not having been studied as much as both Catalan and Occitan, many people still label it as a Spanish dialect.

From the 8th century to the 13th century, there was no clear sociolinguistic distinction between Occitania and Catalonia. For instance, the Provençal  troubadour, Albertet de Sestaró, says: "Monks, tell me which according to your knowledge are better: the French or the Catalans? and here I shall put Gascony, Provence, Limousin, Auvergne and Viennois while there shall be the land of the two kings." In Marseille, a typical Provençal song is called 'Catalan song'.

Internal variation

Most linguists separate Catalan and Occitan, but both languages have been treated as one in studies by Occitan linguists attempting to classify the dialects of Occitan in supradialectal groups, such is the case of Pierre Bec and, more recently, of Domergue Sumien.

Both join together in an Aquitano-Pyrenean or Pre-Iberian group including Catalan, Gascon and a part of  Languedocien, leaving the rest of Occitan in one (Sumien: Arverno-Mediterranean) or two groups (Bec: Arverno-Mediterranean, Central Occitan).

The answer to the question of whether Gascon or Catalan should be considered dialects of Occitan or separate languages has long been a matter of opinion or convention, rather than based on scientific ground. However, two recent studies support Gascon's being considered a distinct language. For the very first time, a quantifiable, statistics-based approach was applied by Stephan Koppelberg in attempt to solve this issue. Based on the results he obtained, he concludes that Catalan, Occitan, and Gascon should all be considered three distinct languages. More recently, Y. Greub and J.P. Chambon (Sorbonne University, Paris) demonstrated that the formation of Proto-Gascon was already complete at the eve of the 7th century, whereas Proto-Occitan was not yet formed at that time. These results induced linguists to do away with the conventional classification of Gascon, favoring the "distinct language" alternative. Both studies supported the early intuition of late Kurt Baldinger, a specialist of both medieval Occitan and medieval Gascon, who recommended that Occitan and Gascon be classified as separate languages.

Linguistic variation

Similarities between Catalan, Occitan and Aragonese

Differences between Catalan and Occitan 

Most of the differences of the vowel system stem from neutralizations that take place on unstressed syllables.
In both languages a stressed syllable has a great number of possible different vowels,
while phonologically different vowels end up being articulated in the same way in an unstressed syllable.
Although this neutralization is common to both languages, the details differ markedly. In Occitan the form of neutralization depends on whether a vowel is pretonic (before the stressed syllable) or posttonic (after the stressed syllable).
In contrast neutralization in Catalan is the same regardless of the position of the unstressed syllable (although it differs from dialect to dialect).  Many of these changes happened in the 14th or late 13th century.

Slightly older are the palatalizations present in Occitan before a palatal or velar consonant:

Lexical comparison 

Variations in the spellings and pronunciations of numbers in several Occitano-Romance dialects:

The numbers 1 and 2 have both feminine and masculine forms agreeing with the object they modify.

References

 
Languages of France
Languages of Spain